Portrait of a Painted Lady is a studio album by Kikki Danielsson, released on 22 September 2017.

Professional reviews
Aftonbladet's Per Magnusson gave the album three stars out of five possible.

Tracklisting

Chart positions

References

2018 albums
Kikki Danielsson albums